Mladen Žujović (1895—1969) was Serbian and Yugoslav attorney and professor of Law at Belgrade University. He was known as member of British-supported secret society Konspiracija and during the World War II as a member of the Central National Committee of the Kingdom of Yugoslavia and since 1943 commander of Yugoslav Army in the Fatherland in Dalmatia, Lika and Western Bosnia and Herzegovina.

Biography 
Žujović was born on 5 June 1895 in Belgrade, Kingdom of Serbia. He was attorney PhD and professor at Belgrade University.

On 8 August 1938 a secret society Konspiracija, established to perform coup d etat and overthrow regime of Prince Pavle with support of United Kingdom had their first meeting presided by Slobodan Jovanović in a house of Žujović. Dragiša Vasić, Milan Žujović and Milan Nikolić were members of the Executive Council of the Conspiracy.

Together with Dragiša Vasić, Žujović created a plan to establish Central National Committee of the Kingdom of Yugoslavia (CNK). Žujović went to Belgrade to select candidates for membership of CNK. Eventually he recruited a number of people while he personally was a member of the CNK.

Since May 1943 he moved to Split. At the end of June 1943, Italians arrested Žujović in action against Chetniks coordinated with Germans who arrested Pavle Đurišić a little earlier. After he was appointed as a delegate of Draža Mihailović for Dalmatia, Lika and Western Bosnia and Herzegovina with rank of Lieutenant Colonel.

When Italian forces surrendered to communist forces in Dalmatia in the Autumn of 1943 Žujović fled to Italy and then to Cairo. He was sentenced to death in absentia during the trial against Draza Mihailovic and his accomplices. Žujović died in Paris, France, 1969.

Thanks to Teodora Žujović the manuscripts of Mladen Žujović that he took with him as a refugee were published.

References

Sources 

 
 
 
 
 
 
 

1895 births
1969 deaths
Chetnik personnel of World War II
Royal Yugoslav Army personnel
Defence ministers of Serbia
People sentenced to death in absentia